Jonathon Stevens "Jon Driver" (4 July 1962 – 28 November 2011) was a psychologist and neuroscientist. He was a leading figure in the study of perception, selective attention and multisensory integration in the normal and damaged human brain.

Education
Driver was born in Halifax, West Yorkshire, on 4 July 1962. He studied at The Queen's College, Oxford and received a First Class degree in Experimental Psychology in 1984. He then stayed on at Oxford for his DPhil (awarded in 1988), under the supervision of Alan Allport and Peter McLeod.

Career
Following postdoctoral work in the US with Michael Posner at the University of Oregon, Driver took up a lectureship in the Department of Experimental Psychology at Cambridge University in 1990. In 1996 he was appointed to a professorship at Birkbeck College, and in 1998 he became Professor of Cognitive Neuroscience at University College London (UCL). From 2004 - 2009 he was Director of the UCL Institute of Cognitive Neuroscience, an interdisciplinary research centre that studies mental processes in the human brain. From 2009 Driver held a Royal Society Anniversary Research Professorship, which allowed him to concentrate on research. He was also a principal investigator at the Wellcome Trust Centre for Neuroimaging at UCL.

Honours
In 2005 Driver was elected as a Fellow of the Academy of Medical Sciences; in 2006 as a member of Academia Europaea, the Academy of Europe; and in 2008 as a Fellow of the British Academy.

Driver received many prestigious awards during his career, including the Spearman Medal of the British Psychological Society, the Experimental Psychology Society (EPS) Prize, and the EPS Mid-Career Award. He was also awarded a Royal Society-Leverhulme Trust Senior Research Fellowship and a Royal Society Wolfson Research Merit Award. From 2009, Driver held a Royal Society Anniversary Research Professorship (one of only six scientists selected across all disciplines).

Research
Driver's research focused on selective attention, spatial cognition and multisensory integration (the interplay between our different senses) in the healthy and damaged human brain (e.g. in hemispatial neglect). He used an integrative methodological approach combining psychophysical, neuropsychological, neuroimaging and TMS, and was one of the first to perform concurrent TMS-fMRI to study how dynamic interactions between brain regions can support cognitive functions. His work revealed differential influences on face processing from attention and emotion in the human brain, with the amygdala response to threat-related expressions unaffected by a manipulation of attention that strongly modulates the response to faces in fusiform gyri. He also probed the neural mechanisms of crossmodal links in attention - such as sudden touch on one hand improving vision near that hand - showing that these can be mediated by back-projections from multimodal parietal areas to unimodal visual cortex.

His research was funded by the Medical Research Council, the Wellcome Trust, the Biotechnology and Biological Sciences Research Council, the Economic and Social Research Council, the James S. McDonnell Foundation, and The Stroke Association. Driver authored over 200 scientific publications, and his work has been cited over 50,000 times. He played an instrumental role as a member of the team leading UCL's successful bid for the Sainsbury-Wellcome Centre.

Personal life
Driver was brought up in Hull and attended Hymers College, where he played cello in the school orchestra and also played bass guitar in a number of bands in Hull. From his teens onwards he was a devoted and expert fly fisherman, which he pursued in the chalk streams of southern England.

He took his own life in London on 28 November 2011, aged 49, ten months after shattering his knee in a motorcycle accident which left him in debilitating chronic pain. He is survived by his wife, Nilli Lavie, and their two sons.

Jon Driver Prize
To honour the memory of Jon Driver, a group of friends and colleagues established the Jon Driver Prize. Reflecting Jon Driver’s commitment to mentorship and his seminal contribution to promoting neuroscience at UCL, the prize is awarded competitively every year to recognise high-quality research of students completing their PhD in the field of neuroscience at UCL.

Selected publications
 
 
  
 
.

References

External links 
 Obituary (UCL)
 Obituary (The Times) 
 Obituary (Trends in Cognitive Sciences) 
 Personal tributes

Alumni of The Queen's College, Oxford
Members of Academia Europaea
Fellows of the Academy of Medical Sciences (United Kingdom)
Fellows of the British Academy
Academics of University College London
British neuroscientists
Wellcome Trust
People from Halifax, West Yorkshire
1962 births
2011 deaths